Nurol Yatirim Bankasi, referred to as Nurol Bank in English, is a financial services company based in Turkey. It is located in Maslak, an area of Istanbul, their offices are based in Nurol Plaza.

Overview 
Nurol Bank is a bank in Turkey with TRL1.8 billion consolidated assets as of October, 2017.  It is a subsidiary of Nurol Holding a large conglomerate in Turkey, headquartered in Ankara, owned by the Carmikli Family.

Nurol Investment Bank started investment banking activities in 1999. Commencing operations in May 1999, it falls under the regulatory purview of the Banking Regulation and Supervision Agency of Turkey (BRSA), provides services in the field of Corporate Banking, Investment Banking and Treasury & Financial Institutions via its branch with a staff force of 43 people as of 2016 with a total asset size of TRY 1,169 Bio

Ownership
The shares of the stock of Nurol Bank are privately held by members of the Carmikli family and Nurol Holding

See also
 List of banks in Turkey

References

External links
 

Banks of Turkey
Companies listed on the Istanbul Stock Exchange
Turkish brands
Companies based in Istanbul